Lee Yeong-jae (Hanja: 李英才; born 13 September 1994) is a South Korean football midfielder who plays for Suwon FC and the South Korea national team.

Club career 
Lee joined Ulsan Hyundai in 2015 and made his league debut against Jeonnam Dragons on 5 July 2015. On 25 October 2015, he scored first goal against Jeonnam Dragons.

He moved to Busan IPark on loan on 8 February 2016.

International career 
He was a member of the South Korea national U-23 team for the 2015 King's Cup and 2016 AFC U-23 Championship. He has played 20 games and scored 4 goals for South Korea Olympics.

Club career statistics

Honours

Club
Ulsan Hyundai
KFA Cup: 2017

International
South Korea U-23
King's Cup: 2015

South Korea
EAFF E-1 Football Championship: 2019

References

1994 births
Living people
Footballers from Seoul
Association football midfielders
South Korean footballers
Ulsan Hyundai FC players
Busan IPark players
Gyeongnam FC players
Gangwon FC players
K League 1 players
K League 2 players